Arauchemus is a genus of South American ground spiders that was first described by R. Ott & Antônio Brescovit in 2012.  it contains only two species, both found in Brazil: A. graudo and A. miudo.

References

Araneomorphae genera
Gnaphosidae
Spiders of Brazil
Taxa named by Antônio Brescovit